Marwa Bouzayani (born 26 March 1997) is a Tunisian athlete. She competed in the women's 3000 metres steeplechase event at the 2019 World Athletics Championships. She competed at the 2020 Summer Olympics, running a personal best of 9:31.25 in the heats.

In 2016, she finished in 11th place in the final of the women's 3000 metres steeplechase event at the 2016 IAAF World U20 Championships held in Bydgoszcz, Poland.

References

External links
 

1997 births
Living people
Tunisian female middle-distance runners
Tunisian female steeplechase runners
Place of birth missing (living people)
World Athletics Championships athletes for Tunisia
Athletes (track and field) at the 2019 African Games
Athletes (track and field) at the 2014 Summer Youth Olympics
African Games competitors for Tunisia
Athletes (track and field) at the 2020 Summer Olympics
Olympic athletes of Tunisia
21st-century Tunisian women
Athletes (track and field) at the 2022 Mediterranean Games
Mediterranean Games silver medalists for Tunisia
Mediterranean Games medalists in athletics